Thetford Academy may refer to:

The Thetford Academy, Norfolk
Thetford Academy, Vermont